The Women's 4 × 5 kilometre relay cross-country skiing event was part of the cross-country skiing programme at the 1976 Winter Olympics, in Innsbruck, Austria. It was the sixth appearance of the women's relay event and the first to have a team of four skiers, instead of three. The competition was held on 12 February 1976, at the Cross Country Skiing Stadium.

Results

References

Women's cross-country skiing at the 1976 Winter Olympics
Women's 4 × 5 kilometre relay cross-country skiing at the Winter Olympics
Oly
Cross